The North La Junta School is a historic school building in North La Junta, Colorado, United States. It was built in 1914 and was listed on the National Register of Historic Places in 1992.

Description
It is located in what was a small rural community of North La Junta across the Arkansas River from the larger town of La Junta in southeastern Colorado. 

It was designed by architect Walter Dubree and was built by J.A. Dahlgreen.

It has also been known as North School, and as North La Junta Elementary School.

Besides serving as the only school in North La Junta, it was important as a meeting hall/auditorium, as a community theatre, and otherwise as a community center.

It is located at junction of State Highway 109 (Main Street) and State Highway 194 (Trail Street) in North La Junta.

See also

 National Register of Historic Places listings in Otero County, Colorado

References

External links

Schools in Colorado
National Register of Historic Places in Otero County, Colorado
Late 19th and Early 20th Century American Movements architecture
Buildings and structures completed in 1914